The Men's 50 kilometre cross-country skiing event was part of the cross-country skiing programme at the 1964 Winter Olympics, in Innsbruck, Austria. The competition was held on 5 February 1964, at the Cross Country Skiing Stadium.

Results

References

Men's cross-country skiing at the 1964 Winter Olympics
Men's 50 kilometre cross-country skiing at the Winter Olympics